Mark Laurie may refer to:
Mark Laurie (photographer) (born 1955), Canadian photographer
Mark Laurie (rugby league) (born 1962), Australian rugby league footballer